The Inner West & Leppington Line (numbered T2, coloured light blue) is a commuter rail service currently operated by Sydney Trains, serving the inner west and south-western regions of Sydney, Australia. The line commenced operations on 26 November 2017, replacing the T2 Airport, Inner West & South Line.

History 

Following the 2011 state election, the newly elected O'Farrell government embarked on reform of transport in New South Wales, and created a new organisation, Transport for NSW, in November of that year. This was followed up with another government reform, which saw Sydney Trains take over operation of the Sydney suburban rail network from CityRail in July 2013.

Transport for NSW developed a new rail timetable and branding, which was put into effect on 20 October 2013. This saw three of CityRail's lines - the Airport & East Hills Line, the Inner West Line and the South Line - merged to form the Airport, Inner West & South Line. A new numbering system was also introduced and the new line was given the number T2. The 2013 timetable was designed to integrate the projects of the Rail Clearways Program, a 2004 plan to divide the network's fourteen metropolitan rail lines into five independent "clearways" by installing extra tracks, passing loops, turnouts and turnbacks at pinch points around the network. By 2013, the Rail Clearways Program was substantially complete. At the same time, the delivery of 78 new Waratah trains was almost complete as well.

During the CityRail era, the Airport & East Hills Line was through-routed with the South Line, and the Inner West Line formed a loop with the Bankstown Line. A substantial change introduced by the 2013 timetable was the abolition of Bankstown loop services and most Liverpool via Regents Park services. These changes were made possible by Rail Clearways projects to construct new turnbacks at Homebush and Lidcombe. This allowed the operation of the Inner West and Bankstown lines to be separated, freeing up capacity between Lidcombe and Homebush for use by other services. However, the changes attracted criticism due to the increased number of interchanges and increase in travel time for passengers for all stations between Carramar/Berala and Birrong.

The former T2 line added a branch to Leppington on 13 December 2015, replacing a temporary shuttle service to Liverpool.

Current line
A new Sydney Trains timetable was introduced on 26 November 2017. The former T2 line was split in two. The new T2 consists of services from Leppington to the city via Granville, with a branch to Parramatta being added. A new T8 line provides services from Macarthur to the city via Sydney Airport or Sydenham. The new T2 is coloured light blue - a similar colour to CityRail's South Line. The T8 inherited the green line colour from the old T2, which was itself derived from the colour of CityRail's Airport & East Hills Line.

T5 services were modified to no longer travel to and from Campbelltown, instead starting and terminating at Leppington. These changes mean the section of the network between Glenfield and Macarthur is served exclusively by services operating via the East Hills railway line.

Future line 
In 2020, Transport for NSW commenced planning for rail services west of Bankstown, including the release of an options paper indicating a preference for the return of the Liverpool to City via Regents Park service.

Route 
Services on the Inner West & Leppington Line commence by taking the City Circle (generally in an anti-clockwise direction) and then the Main Suburban railway line, on the local pair of tracks. At Homebush, trains on the "inner west" stopping pattern terminate. Services that proceed further west towards Parramatta to Leppington merge onto the suburban pair of tracks. At Granville, trains can take the Main Western line a short distance to Parramatta or the Old Main South railway line to a junction north of Cabramatta, then continuing onto the Main South railway line as far as Glenfield. At a junction south of Glenfield, services switch to the South West Rail Link to reach the terminus at Leppington. The following stations are served by T2 Inner West & Leppington Line trains:
 Museum, St James, Circular Quay, Wynyard, Town Hall and Central on the City Circle

Services 
The line usually runs on two stopping patterns. The first stopping pattern runs to Leppington, making limited stops between  Redfern and Homebush , with the specific stopping pattern depending on the time of day. West of Homebush all trains make all stops, except for Clyde, where trains do not stop on weekends. The second stopping pattern makes all stops between Redfern and Homebush, with many weekdays trains continuing to Parramatta,  making all stops. These two patterns both run at 4tph (trains per hour) during the off-peak, with additional services during the peaks. Additionally, there are express trains between Ashfield and the city during the morning peak.

Patronage
The following table shows the patronage of Sydney Trains network for the year ending 30 June 2022.

See also

References

Sydney Trains
Municipality of Strathfield